Mitochondrial elongation factor 2 is a protein that in humans is encoded by the MIEF2 gene.

MID49 Protein Structure 
The MID49 protein is used to assist in mitochondrial binary fission. It is a dynamic peripheral protein receptor found on the surface of the mitochondrial membrane. MID51 is a very similar protein and studies have shown that it has a variant nucleotidyl transferase structure which allows it to move phosphates as a co-factor. This structure and ability is essential because it allows it to interact with ADP which will activate the Drp1 protein. Further studies have shown that MID49 and MID51 are homologous in sequence and MID49 also has a nucleotidyl transferase domain but it is still unknown if MID49 can also bind a co-factor. Instead of a co-factor ligand, it was found that MID49 has a loop structure on its surface that allows it to physically interact with the Drp1 protein. To recap, the MID51 and MID49 are both similar proteins that recruit Drp1 protein to induce mitochondrial binary fission but they have small differences in structure which allows them to bind Drp1 in different ways.

MID49 Protein's Role in Mitochondrial Binary Fission 
The MID49 peripheral protein will attract the Drp1 to the surface of the mitochondrial membrane which then induces endoplasmic reticulum contact. The ER then releases Ca2+ into the mitochondria once there is physical contact at the membrane. The influx of calcium induces a constriction response in the mitochondria. With this constriction in the middle, the MID49 keeps recruiting more and more Drp1 proteins to make a sort of chain structure to wrap around that narrowed area called the oligomeric ring. The Drp1 proteins will eventually disassociate with the MID49 proteins through hydrolysis which causes a much tighter constriction around the mitochondria. There are still studies being done to confirm if this constriction alone will then split the mitochondria in the middle to complete a binary fission event.

Function

This gene encodes an outer mitochondrial membrane protein that functions in the regulation of mitochondrial morphology. It can directly recruit the fission mediator dynamin-related protein 1 (Drp1) to the mitochondrial surface. The gene is located within the Smith-Magenis syndrome region on chromosome 17. Alternative splicing results in multiple transcript variants encoding different isoforms. [provided by RefSeq, Jun 2011].

References 
(Updated 2 and 3 reference list)

2. Losón, Oliver C; Meng, Shuxia; Ngo, Huu; Liu, Raymond; Kaiser, Jens T; Chan, David C (2015-3). "Crystal structure and functional analysis of MiD49, a receptor for the mitochondrial fission protein Drp1". Protein Science.

3. Fenton, Adam R.; Jongens, Thomas A.; Holzbaur, Erika L. F. (2021-02-01). "Mitochondrial dynamics: Shaping and remodeling an organelle network". Current Opinion in Cell Biology. Cell Architecture. 68: 28–36.

Further reading